Uno-X Pro Cycling Team is a Norwegian UCI ProTeam founded in 2010.

Team roster

Major wins

2014
 National Road Race championships, Michael Olsson
2016
Scandinavian Race Uppsala, Syver Wærsted
2017
Fyen Rundt, Audun Fløtten
2018
Stage 3 International Tour of Rhodes, Syver Waersted
Ringerike GP, Syver Waersted
Omloop Het Nieuwsblad Beloften, Erik Resell
2019
Ringerike GP, Kristoffer Skjerping, 
Stage 3 Oberösterreichrundfahrt, Anders Skaarseth
 National Time Trial championships, Andreas Leknessund
Stage 4 Arctic Race of Norway, Markus Hoelgaard
Gylne Gutuer, Kristoffer Skjerping
2020 
International Rhodes Grand Prix, Erlend Blikra
Stage 2 International Tour of Rhodes, Erlend Blikra
 National Hill Climb championships, Morten Alexander Hulgaard
 National Time Trial championships, Andreas Leknessund
Hafjell GP, Andreas Leknessund
Stage 2 Bałtyk–Karkonosze Tour, Frederik Rodenberg
Lillehammer GP, Andreas Leknessund
 National U23 Time Trial championships, Julius Johansen
 National U23 Road Race championships, Martin Urianstad
 National U23 Road Race championships, Julius Johansen
Stage 2 Tour of Małopolska, Jonas Abrahamsen
Stage 3 Tour of Małopolska, Torstein Træen
 Overall Giro della Friuli Venezia Giulia
Stage 1 (TTT) 
Stage 3, Andreas Leknessund
2021 
 Overall Tour de la Mirabelle, Idar Andersen
Prologue, Idar Andersen
Stage 3, Erlend Blikra
Fyen Rundt, Niklas Larsen
Dwars door het Hageland, Rasmus Tiller
Stage 1 Arctic Race of Norway, Markus Hoelgaard
Stages 3 & 4 Czech Cycling Tour, Tobias Halland Johannessen
Stage 3 Okolo Slovenska, Kristoffer Halvorsen
UCI World U23 Time Trial Championships, Johan Price-Pejtersen
Lillehammer GP, Idar Andersen
Paris–Tours Espoirs, Jonas Iversby Hvideberg
 National U23 Time Trial championships, Johan Price-Pejtersen
2022 
Grand Prix Megasaray, Tord Gudmestad
Stage 4 Étoile de Bessèges, Tobias Halland Johannessen
Stage 3 Tour of Oman, Anthon Charmig
  Overall Tour of Antalya, Jacob Hindsgaul Madsen
Stage 3, Jacob Hindsgaul Madsen
Boucles de l'Aulne, Idar Andersen
 National U23 Road Race championships, Søren Wærenskjold
 National Road Race championships, Rasmus Tiller
UCI World U23 Time Trial Championships, Søren Wærenskjold
Stage 6 Tour de Langkawi, Erlend Blikra
2023
Stage 3 Saudi Tour, Søren Wærenskjold
Stage 1 Volta ao Algarve, Alexander Kristoff

Supplementary statistics
Sources:

World & National Championships
2014
 Sweden Road Race, Michael Olsson
2019
 Norway Time Trial, Andreas Leknessund
2020
 World Track (Team Pursuit), Julius Johansen
 Denmark Hill Climb, Morten Alexander Hulgaard
 Norway Time Trial, Andreas Leknessund
 Denmark U23 Time Trial, Julius Johansen
 Norway U23 Road Race, Martin Urianstad
 Denmark U23 Road Race, Julius Johansen
2021
 World U23 Time Trial, Johan Price-Pejtersen
2022
 World U23 Time Trial, Søren Wærenskjold

References

External links
 

UCI Continental Teams (Europe)
UCI Professional Continental teams
Cycling teams based in Norway
Cycling teams established in 2010